O'Bannon Mill (also known as O'Bannon Corporation Leather Division, or Collins & Aikman Mill) is an historical mill at 90 Bay Spring Avenue in Barrington, Rhode Island.  It was one of the first places where artificial leather (using pyroxylin) was manufactured on a large scale.

History
In 1905, George B. Frost founded the Frost Finishing Company and built the original 1905 structure which is part of the current O'Bannon building. Mr. O'Bannon, the treasurer, bought Frost's shares and the mill became the largest manufacturer of imitation leather in the world. O'Bannon went on to acquire other mills arounds Rhode Island and New Jersey.  Mr. O'Bannon became incompetent in 1921, died in 1923 and the company went bankrupt in 1926. Cranston Worsted Mills and then Collins & Aikman and finally American Tourister and Piling Chain owned the company until the 1970s.  The mill building was converted into elderly apartment housing in the early 1990s, known as the "Barrington Cove Apartments". It was added to the National Register of Historic Places in 1996.

See also
National Register of Historic Places listings in Bristol County, Rhode Island

Notes

External links
Barrington Cove Apartments official site
History of the mill from "History of the O'Bannon Mill" from A lecture and slide presentation by Virginia Adams, April 23, 1997 at the Barrington Public Library, Sponsored by:The Barrington Preservation Society 

Industrial buildings completed in 1905
Industrial buildings and structures on the National Register of Historic Places in Rhode Island
Buildings and structures in Barrington, Rhode Island
National Register of Historic Places in Bristol County, Rhode Island
Artificial leather
1905 establishments in Rhode Island